Sardar Mushtaq Ahmed Khan Laghari is from Rahimabad. He was born in Choti Zareen. He is the son of Sardar Mohammad Akbar Khan Laghari. His paternal grandfather was Sardar Noor Mohammed Khan Leghari, founder of Rahimabad. His maternal grandfather Sardar Din Mohammed Khan Leghari, was given the title of Khan Bahadur on 12th December, 1911 and Most Eminent Order of the Indian Empire and C.I.E. (Companion of the Indian Empire) On 1st January, 1916. He was also the Leghari tribe's Tumandar.

Education 

Sardar Mushtaq Ahmed Khan Laghari started his education from the Convent School in Multan and later joined Aitchison Chief's College in junior school. He graduated from Aitchison College as Best Leaving Boy from Godley House in 1962 to join the Pakistan Air Force Academy in Risalpur.

PAF career 

Sardar Mushtaq Ahmed Khan Laghari got his commission as a fighter pilot in the Pakistan Air Force. He was the Wing Under Officer (WUO) of his graduating course. In the Air Force, he rose to the rank of Air Vice Marshal. In 1997 he decided to accept a diplomatic appointment and became Pakistan's Ambassador to the UAE.

In his years of service with the Pakistan Air Force, he saw action in the 1965 war and the 1971 war between Pakistan and India. A highly decorated officer of the Pakistan Air Force, he was known in the Air Force for his leadership, generosity, bravery, honesty, integrity, and fighter flying skills of the highest caliber.

While serving with the Air Force he commanded a fighter squadron, a fighter wing, a fighter base, one of the three Air Commands of the PAF, and also served as a Principal Staff Officer / Deputy Chief of the Air Staff at the Air Headquarters. In the course of his career with the PAF he also served on deputation with the Syrian Arab Air Force and the UAE Air Force in Senior Combat & Command positions.

Retirement 
After retirement from active service, Sardar Mushtaq Ahmed Khan Laghari was elected President of the Pakistan Air Force Retired Officers Association (PAFROA) in Lahore, Pakistan.

Sardar Mushtaq Ahmed Khan Laghari enjoys playing golf and looking after his agricultural lands.

References

Pakistan Air Force air marshals
Baloch people
Living people
Ambassadors of Pakistan to the United Arab Emirates
People from Rahim Yar Khan District
Year of birth missing (living people)